This is a complete discography of the hard rock band Tesla. They have released eight full-length studio albums, four live albums, three compilation albums, three video releases, two tribute albums, one extended play album and 23 singles.

Albums

Studio albums

Acoustic albums

Live albums

Compilation albums

Tribute and cover albums

Soundtracks

Video albums

Extended plays

Singles

References

External links
 Official discography of Tesla
 

Discographies of American artists
Rock music group discographies
Heavy metal discographies